Union for the International Language Ido (Ido: Uniono por la Linguo Internaciona Ido, ULI) is the official union of the Ido-language movement from 1910. Based in Amsterdam, Netherlands, its main functions are the propagation of the language, arranging the yearly conferences in which Ido speakers gather, and the publishing of the magazine Progreso (Progress), begun in 1908 by Louis Couturat, one of the founders of the movement who died in 1914.
The ULI is to Ido as the Universal Esperanto Association is to Esperanto. 

The current ULI-president is Gaël Richard.

Address
9 rue des Mouettes
F-56640 ARZON
France

External links
Official site

Ido language
Organizations established in 1910